Alkmund of Derby (or of Lilleshall), also spelt Ealhmund, Alhmund, Alcmund, or Alchmund (d. c. 800) was a son of Alhred of Northumbria, who was caught up in the kingdom's dynastic struggles.

History
After more than twenty years in exile among the Picts, Alkmund returned with an army. As king, he acquired a reputation for being charitable to the poor and orphaned. He was killed about 800, for which King Eardwulf of Northumbria was held responsible. Whatever the exact circumstances, his death was regarded as a martyrdom, and Alkmund as a saint.

He was buried first in Shropshire, and then removed to "Northworthy", i.e. modern Derby, because of Viking raids.

Miracles were reported at the tomb. In the early tenth century, his remains were translated to Shrewsbury, probably by Æthelflæd, Lady of the Mercians.

When St Alkmund's, Shrewsbury became the property of Lilleshall Abbey about 1145, his body was translated back to Derby.

When St Alkmund's Church, Derby was demolished in 1968, traces of several earlier churches were revealed, stretching back to the 9th century. Artefacts found included the stone sarcophagus now in Derby Museum and Art Gallery.

Six churches in England are dedicated to him, at Derby (replaced by St Alkmund's (new) Church, Derby), Duffield (Derbyshire), Shrewsbury, Whitchurch (Shropshire), Aymestrey (Herefordshire) and Blyborough (Lincolnshire).

His feast day is 19 March.

Gallery

See also
 Alchmund of Hexham

References

External links
 
 

8th-century Christian saints
Anglo-Saxon warriors
Northumbrian saints
History of Northumberland
800 deaths
770s births
8th-century English people
8th-century births